() is a military rank used in the militaries of many Arab nations, and formerly of the Ottoman Armed Forces. Usually, it ranks below Fariq 'awal and above Liwa.

Ottoman use

It was senior to a Mirliva (Brigadier General, modern Tuğgeneral in the Turkish Army) and junior to a Birinci Ferik (Lieutenant General, modern Korgeneral in the Turkish Army).

The collar mark (later shoulder mark) and cap of a Ferik had three stripes and two stars during the early years of the Turkish Republic. The Ottoman Army and pre-1934 Turkish Army had three general ranks (similar to the British ranking system), while the current Turkish Army has four general ranks (similar to the American ranking system), with the inclusion of General (Orgeneral) as the fourth introduced in 1934. 

The title of Ferik was abolished with Act No. 2590 of 26 November 1934 on the Abolition of Titles and Appellations such as Efendi, Bey or Pasha.

Current use

See also 
 Military ranks of the Ottoman Empire
 Comparative army officer ranks of Arabophone countries
 Comparative navy officer ranks of Arabophone countries
 Comparative air force officer ranks of Arabophone countries

References 

Military ranks of the Ottoman Empire
Arab military ranks
Turkish words and phrases
Arabic words and phrases